Albert Louis Latter (October 17, 1921, Kokomo, Indiana – June 8, 1997, Pacific Palisades, Los Angeles) was an American nuclear physicist and leading expert on nuclear weapons.

Biography
Latter graduated from the University of California, Los Angeles (UCLA) with a bachelor's degree in mathematics and physics in 1941 and with a Ph.D. in physics in 1951. Immediately after receiving his Ph.D. he joined the Santa Monica headquarters of RAND Corporation, where for the next twenty years he worked on nuclear weapons.

In the 1950s Albert Latter and Edward Teller worked together on the United States Air Force Scientific Advisory Board, where Teller attended his first meeting as a member in early 1952 at the invitation of his old friend Theodore von Karman. Teller and Latter were the co-authors of the controversial book Our Nuclear Future: Facts, Dangers, and Opportunities, published in 1958 by Criterion Books.

Albert Latter's brother Richard Latter (1923–1999) was also a noteworthy physicist and they worked together at RAND.

In 1971 Albert Latter resigned from RAND and, together his brother Richard and most of RAND's physics department, founded in Marina del Rey the defense research company R&D Associates (RDA) which was acquired in 1983 by Logicon Inc., which became a subsidiary of Northrop Grumman in 1997. Albert Latter was the president and CEO of R&D Associates until his retirement in 1985.

He received the 1964 Ernest O. Lawrence Award from the Atomic Energy Commission "for contributions in the determination of the destructive effects as well as in the decoupling of nuclear explosions and in the design of nuclear weapons."

Upon his death Albert Latter was survived by his wife, two daughter, and three grandchildren.

Selected publications

References

1921 births
1997 deaths
20th-century American physicists
American nuclear physicists
Theoretical physicists
University of California, Los Angeles alumni
RAND Corporation people